The Anglican Diocese of Dunkwa-on-Offin  is a Ghanaian diocese of the Church of the Province of West Africa, a member church of the worldwide Anglican Communion.  Its partner diocese is the Diocese of Portsmouth. The current bishop is Edmund Dawson Ahmoah.

References

Anglican dioceses in Ghana
Dioceses of the Church of the Province of West Africa
Dioceses in Ghana
Anglican bishops of Cape Coast